The 2013 National Premier League Queensland is the first season under the new competition format in Queensland.  The league consists of 14 teams across the State of Queensland. Brisbane City, Olympic FC and Redlands United joined from the Brisbane Premier League. Brisbane Strikers, QAS and Sunshine Coast Fire joined from the previous Queensland State League. Central Queensland FC, FNQ FC Heat and Northern Fury each had sides from their cities participating in the previous Queensland State League but new consortiums won bids to participate in the NPL and new identities were created, Fury taking on the identity of the former A-League club North Queensland Fury.

Complete new entities, Western Pride FC and Moreton Bay Jets were formed while Palm Beach Sharks was drawn from the Gold Coast Premier League but were former participants in years gone past in the Brisbane Premier League.

Teams

Regular season
The National Premier League Queensland 2013 season will be played over 22 rounds, beginning on 8 March with the regular season concluding on 18 August 2013.

Olympic FC went through the first round of matches undefeated with 10 wins and 1 draw. Their first loss was at the hands of Brisbane City who won their round 12 clash, 3-1. This was after Olympic defeated Brisbane City 6-2 in the inaugural NPL Queensland match.

The Round 3 match between Western Pride and Sunshine Coast Fire was called off at approximately the 80 minute mark due to a severe thunderstorm. Fire were leading 4-0 at the time and under the competition rules, were awarded the win.

The Round 10 match between Moreton Bay Jets and Western Pride was abandoned at the 80 minute mark due to an electrical floodlight failure. The Jets were leading 1-0 at the time and were awarded the victory under the competition rules.

Olympic FC claimed the Premiers title in Round 20 with a 3-1 victory over the Moreton Bay Jets at Goodwin Park on 4 August 2013.

Olympic FC, Brisbane City, Sunshine Coast Fire and the Brisbane Strikers formed the top four teams and therefore qualified for the finals series.

Managers

Managerial changes

Home and away season

Week 1

Week 2

Week 3

Week 4

Week 5

Week 6

Week 7

Week 8

Week 9

Week 10

Week 11

Week 12

Week 13

Week 14

Week 15

Week 16

Week 17

Week 18

Week 19

Week 20

Week 21

Week 22

Finals series

Semi-finals

Grand Final

Top Goalscorers

Top Goalscorers by Club

See also
National Premier League Queensland
Football Queensland

References

Soccer leagues in Queensland